Skull & Crossbows is an adventure module published in 1990 for the Advanced Dungeons & Dragons fantasy role-playing game.

Plot summary
Skull & Crossbows is a sequel to SJA1 Wildspace and consists of several connected Spelljammer adventure scenarios in which space pirates are involved.

Publication history
SJA2 Skull & Crossbows was written by Nigel Findley, with a cover by Brom, and was published by TSR in 1990 as a 64-page booklet with a map and an outer folder.

Reception

Reviews

References

Dungeons & Dragons modules
Role-playing game supplements introduced in 1990
Spelljammer